Vladyslav Serhiyovych Chushenko (born 27 October 2000) is a Ukrainian professional footballer who plays as a left-back for Mariupol on loan from Mynai.

Career
Born in Kyiv, Chushenko is a product of the local Arsenal Kyiv, CSKA Kyiv and Kolos Kovalivka youth sportive school systems.

He played for FC Kolos Kovalivka in the Ukrainian Premier League Reserves and was released in September 2020, when signed a contract with FC Mynai in the Ukrainian Premier League. Chushenko made his debut in the Ukrainian Premier League for Mynai on 9 May 2021, playing as the second half-time substituted player in a losing home match against FC Vorskla Poltava.

References

External links 
 
 

2000 births
Living people
Footballers from Kyiv
Ukrainian footballers
Association football defenders
FC Kolos Kovalivka players
FC Mynai players
FC Uzhhorod players
FC Yarud Mariupol players
Ukrainian Premier League players
Ukrainian First League players